"What Makes a Man" is a song by Irish boy band Westlife. It was released on 18 December 2000 in the UK and Ireland as the third single from their second studio album, Coast to Coast, the first single from the album having been released with Mariah Carey. The song peaked at number two on the UK Singles Chart and was their first single not to peak at number one, being beaten to the Christmas number-one spot by "Can We Fix It?", the theme to the cartoon series Bob the Builder. It also debuted and peaked at number two in Ireland, held off the top spot by Eminem's song "Stan".

The song was the 39th-best-selling single of 2000 in the UK and received a gold sales certification for over 400,000 copies sold. It is the band's fifth-best-selling single in paid-for sales, and seventh-best-selling single in combined sales as of January 2019.

Background
"What Makes a Man" was composed in the traditional verse–chorus form in B major, with Filan and Feehily's vocal ranging from the chords of E4 to Bb5.

Reception
Brian McFadden of Westlife had little faith in the release. Speaking in an interview with Worldpop.com, he remarked: "It's a weak song, and we didn't do much promotional work. Bob [the Builder] deserved it."

Track listings
UK CD1 and cassette single
 "What Makes a Man" (single remix)
 "I'll Be There"
 "My Girl"

UK CD2
 "What Makes a Man" (single remix)
 "I'll Be There"
 "What Becomes of the Brokenhearted"

Charts

Weekly charts

Year-end charts

Certifications and sales

References

2000 singles
2000 songs
Bertelsmann Music Group singles
Music videos directed by Stuart Gosling
RCA Records singles
Song recordings produced by Steve Mac
Songs written by Steve Mac
Songs written by Wayne Hector
Westlife songs